Athens Historic District may refer to:

Athens Courthouse Square Commercial Historic District, Athens, Alabama, listed on the National Register of Historic Places in Limestone County, Alabama
Athens State College Historic District, Athens, Alabama, listed on the National Register of Historic Places in Limestone County, Alabama
Athens Warehouse Historic District, Athens, Georgia, listed on the National Register of Historic Places in Clarke County, Georgia
Downtown Athens Historic District, Athens, Georgia, listed on the National Register of Historic Places in Clarke County, Georgia
Athens-Candler-Church Street Historic District, Winder, Georgia, listed on the National Register of Historic Places in Barrow County, Georgia
Athens Historic District (Athens, Kentucky), listed on the National Register of Historic Places in Fayette County, Kentucky
Athens Lower Village Historic District, Athens, New York, listed on the National Register of Historic Places in Greene County, New York
Athens Downtown Historic District, Athens, Ohio, listed on the NRHP in Athens County, Ohio
Athens Historic District (Athens, Pennsylvania), listed on the National Register of Historic Places in Bradford County, Pennsylvania